Deewan Kauromal Chandanmal Khilnani ([Sindhi:  ديوان ڪوڙومل چندن مل کلناڻي], 5 October 1844 – 16 December 1916) was an educationational, scholar and writer. He was one of the first major prose writer during the British Raj in India. He served as the first principal of the Training College for Men Hyderabad, Sindh, British India (Now Pakistan), City Magistrate, Deputy Collector, Municipal Commissioner and Health Officer. He authored more than 60 books in Sindhi language. He wrote extensively on the panchayat system, health, agriculture, and folklore.

Childhood and education 
Kauromal was born on 5 October 1844 in Bhirya, District Naushehro Feroz, Sindh, British India (Now Pakistan). At his birth he was named 'Pritam', but because none of the children had survived earlier, the women folk felt superstitious and instead of sugar candy (misri) and sugar lump (patashas) they distributed pepper (kara mirch)on his birth. And relatives also changed his name to 'Kauro', meaning bitter. He studied Sindhi and Persian in the private school of Akhund Qazi Muhammad Suleman at village Darya Khan Jalbani (near his hometown Bhirya). He studied there from 1849 to 1855. When first primary school was opened in his hometown in 1855, he got admission there. He was a very intelligent student and mastered Sindhi and Persian language at a very early age. The Education Inspector of Sindh appointed him as a 'Boy Translator' for which he was given a scholarship of Rs 25/-. He then studied at Karachi. He was one of the four Sindhi students who went to Bombay (now Mumbai) for matriculation examination of the University of Bombay (Now University of Mumbai).

Career 
He started his career as a clerk in the office of the Commissioner of Karachi. He then served as a junior school teacher at Hyderabad and Sukkur. Afterwards, he served as Head Master of these schools. He also served as a Sindhi translator.

After qualifying Revenue and Judicial examinations, he was appointed as City Magistrate of Shikarpur and then City Magistrate of Hyderabad. He also served as Deputy Collector of Rohri and Hala sundivisions for seven years. He then joined the education department and served as the founding principal of the Training College for Men Hyderabad. In the year 1866, he got school opened in Bhiriya Sindh from Govt side (which is known as Kauromal Chandanmal Academy after his death). He also served as Municipal Commissioner and Health officer of Hyderabad. He retired in 1899.

After retirement, he remained member of the Sindh Education Department's Text Books Committee for many years. He also served as the as an Examiner for vernacular languages for the convenience of the Englishmen.

Books 
Deewan Kauromal Chandanmal is known as the father of Sindhi prose. He has written many essays on various topics in a simple and effective style. His 44 essays written up to 1907 were compiled by his son Manohar Das Khilnani and published by Sahitya Akademi, Delhi in 1960. He had mastery on Sindhi, Arabic, Persian, English, Sanskrit, Hindi and Bengali languages. He translated many books from Bengali, Hindi, Sanskrit and English into Sindhi. He was among the first who introduced terminology of Geometry and Chemistry into Sindhi. He also produced original work like Mahatmaoon ja Darshan,  Arya Naari Charitra, Bhishma Pitamaha and  Bhaktan joon Sakhiyun. An incomplete alphabetical list of his books is presented below:,

Honours and awards 
In recognition of his competence and services to the society, he was honoured with the title  Rai Bahadur and also gifted with 1160 acres of agricultural land by the British Government of India.

Death 
Deewan Kauromal Chandanmal Khilnani died on 16 December 1916 at the age of 73 years.

References 

Sindhi-language writers
1844 births
1916 deaths
Scholars from Sindh
Sindhi people